The 2016–17 LEB Plata season will be the 17th season of the Spanish basketball third league LEB Plata. Dates must be determined yet.

Teams

Promotion and relegation (pre-season)

Teams relegated from the 2015–16 LEB Oro
Actel Força Lleida (remained in LEB Oro)
Basket Navarra
Teams promoted from the 2015–16 Liga EBA
Arcos Albacete Basket
Hispagan UPB Gandia
Seguros Soliss Alcázar Basket
Torrons Vicens CB L'Hospitalet
Teams promoted after the expansion
Comercial Ulsa CBC Valladolid (was relegated last season)
Agustinos Leclerc
Aquimisa Laboratorios Queso Zamorano

Venues and locations

Regular season

League table

Play-offs
Seeded teams played at home games 1, 2 and 5. Covirán Granada, as Copa LEB Plata champion, played all series as seeded team.

Copa LEB Plata

References and notes

External links
Official website

LEB Plata seasons
LEB